Black Lace are a British pop band, known for their 1984 single "Agadoo".

Black Lace may also refer to:

Black Lace, an erotic fiction imprint of Virgin Books
Black Lace, an erotic magazine for women, sister publication of BLK (magazine)
BlackLace (band), an American heavy metal band

See also 
Lace (disambiguation)